James Lewis Pinfold   (born 1950 in Ealing, West London) is a British-Canadian physicist, specializing in particle physics.

Education and career
Pinfold graduated in physics in 1972 with a B.Sc. from Imperial College London and in 1977 with a Ph.D. from the University of London. His Ph.D. thesis was on weak neutral currents, stemming from his work as part of the Gargamelle discovery team. From 1977 to 1989 he held research assistant and senior research assistant positions at CERN (near Geneva) and Fermilab (near Chicago). From 1989 to 1992 he was an associate professor at the Weizmann Institute of Science. At the University of Alberta, he was from 1992 to 1996 an associate professor and from 1996 to 2016 a full professor, and he is since 2016 a distinguished university professor. From 1995 to 2004 he was the University of Alberta's Centre for Subatomic Research (renamed in 2006 the Centre for Particle Physics). Since 2005 he has held a visiting professorship at King's College London. He frequently travels back and forth between the University of Alberta and CERN in Geneva. He is the author or co-author of over 1250 citable publications and has given over 220 invited talks.

Pinfold was from 1988 to 1989 the spokesperson for CERN's WA88 experiment. From 1987 to 1992 he was the spokesperson for the MODAL experiment at CERN's Large Electron Positron Collider (LEP). He was one of the founders in the 1990s of the ATLAS experiment involved in the Large Hadron Collider (LHC) discovery of the Higgs boson. From 2000 to 2002 he was the deputy spokesperson for ATLAS-Canada. Since 2000 he is the leader and spokesperson for the MoEDAL experiment. From 2004 to 2010 he was the deputy co-spokesperson for the SLIM experiment.

In 2007, he won an award from ASTech (Alberta Science & Technology Leadership Foundation) for his leadership in starting the Alberta Large-area Time-coincidence Array, or ALTA, Project. This educational and research project "involves spreading out many cosmic-ray detectors over vast areas, connecting them through the Internet, and synchronising their readings with an integrated GPS system. Most of the detectors are run by high school students". In 2013 he was elected a Fellow of the Royal Society of Canada (RSC). In 2018 he received the Izaak Walton Killam Memorial Prize.

Selected publications
  1973

References

External links
 (MoEDAL experiment spokesperson James Pinfold)

1950 births
Living people
Alumni of Imperial College London
Alumni of the University of London
Academic staff of the University of Alberta
20th-century British physicists
21st-century British physicists
20th-century Canadian physicists
21st-century Canadian physicists
Particle physicists
People associated with CERN
Fellows of the Royal Society of Canada